Mr. President may refer to:

Mr. President (title), a term of address applied to certain persons holding the title of President or presiding over certain other governmental bodies

Arts, entertainment, and media

Music
Mr. President (musical), a 1962 musical by Irving Berlin
 "Mr. President", a song from the musical 
"Mr. President", 1974 song by Dickie Goodman
"Mr. President", 1981 song by Dickie Goodman
"Mr. President", a song by The Heptones from the 1977 album Party Time
"Mr. President", song by Kylie Minogue from the 2014 album Kiss Me Once
"Mr. President (Have Pity on the Working Man)", a song by Randy Newman from the 1974 album Good Old Boys
"Mr. President", song by Prodigy from the 2017 album Hegelian Dialectic The Book of Revelation
"Mr. President", a song by Janelle Monáe from Metropolis: The Chase Suite

Other arts, entertainment, and media
Mr. President (El Señor Presidente), a 1946 novel by Nobel Prize–winning Guatemalan writer Miguel Ángel Asturias 
The President (El Señor Presidente), a 1970 film adaptation starring Pedro Buchardo
The President (El Señor Presidente), a 1983 film adaptation directed by Manuel Octavio Gómez
The President (El Señor Presidente), a 2007 film adaptation directed by Rómulo Guardia Granier
Mr. President (band), a Eurodance group
Mr. President (radio series), an American series of the 1940s and 1950s
Mr. President (TV series), a 1987 American series
Mr President, a card game from the 3M bookshelf game series

See also
Dear Mr. President (disambiguation)
Mrs. President (disambiguation)
Welcome Mr. President, an Italian 2013 comedy film